Andrew Pollard Ogg (born April 9, 1934, Bowling Green, Ohio) is an American mathematician, a professor emeritus of mathematics at the University of California, Berkeley.

Education
Ogg was a student at Bowling Green State University in the mid 1950s. Ogg received his Ph.D. in 1961 from Harvard University under the supervision of John Tate.

Career
Ogg worked in algebra and number theory. His accomplishments include the Grothendieck–Ogg–Shafarevich formula, Ogg's formula for the conductor of an elliptic curve, the Néron–Ogg–Shafarevich criterion and the 1975 characterization of supersingular primes, the starting point for the theory of monstrous moonshine. He also posed the torsion conjecture in 1973 and is the author of the book Modular forms and Dirichlet series (W. A. Benjamin, 1969).

References 

1934 births
20th-century American mathematicians
21st-century American mathematicians
Harvard University alumni
University of California, Berkeley faculty
Group theorists
Living people
People from Bowling Green, Ohio
Bowling Green State University alumni
Mathematicians from Ohio